Vladimir Ivanovich Fyodorov (5 January 1956 – 11 August 1979) was a Soviet football player. Fyodorov was one of the FC Pakhtakor Tashkent players killed in the 1979 Dniprodzerzhynsk mid-air collision.

Honours
 Olympic bronze: 1976

International career
Fyodorov made his debut for USSR on October 30, 1974 in a UEFA Euro 1976 qualifier against Ireland. He also played in 1978 FIFA World Cup qualifiers (USSR did not qualify for the final tournament in either of those).

References

External links
  Profile
 Career Statistics from KLISF

1956 births
1979 deaths
People from Tashkent Region
Uzbekistani footballers
Soviet footballers
Soviet Union international footballers
Soviet Top League players
Pakhtakor Tashkent FK players
Olympic footballers of the Soviet Union
Footballers at the 1976 Summer Olympics
Olympic bronze medalists for the Soviet Union
Victims of aviation accidents or incidents in Ukraine
Victims of aviation accidents or incidents in the Soviet Union
Olympic medalists in football
Uzbekistani people of Russian descent
Medalists at the 1976 Summer Olympics
Association football forwards